Martha Finley (pen name: Martha Farquharson; April 26, 1828 – January 30, 1909) was an American teacher and author of numerous works for children, the best known being the 28-volume Elsie Dinsmore series which was published over a span of 38 years. Her books tend to be sentimental, with a strong emphasis on religious belief. The daughter of Presbyterian minister Dr. James Brown Finley and his wife and cousin Maria Theresa Brown Finley, she was born on April 26, 1828, in Chillicothe, Ohio. She died in 1909 in Elkton, Maryland.

Early years
Martha Finley was born in Chillicothe, Ohio, April 26, 1828. Her father. Dr. James B Finley, was the oldest son of General Samuel Finley, a Revolutionary officer, major in the Virginia line of cavalry, afterward general of militia in Ohio, and of Mary Brown, daughter of one of Pennsylvania's early legislators. Her maternal grandmother was the daughter of Thomas Butler, who was a great-grandson of that Duke of Ormond who was influential in making the treaty of Utrecht. The Finleys and Browns were of Scotch-Irish descent and had martyr blood in their ancestry. The name of their clan was Farquarharson, the Gaelic of Finley, and for many years Miss Finley used that name as her pen-name.

The Butlers were military men. Five of Miss Finley's great-uncles of that name were in the war of the Revolution, two of them on George Washington's staff. One of her great-uncles, Dr. Samuel Finley, was one of the early presidents of Princeton College. Her grandfathers, both on her father's and mother's side, were wealthy. Her grandfather Finley received large tracts of land from the Government in acknowledgment of his services to his country during the Revolution. He laid out and owned the town of Newville, Pennsylvania. Some of his land was in Ohio, and he finally removed to that State.

Career
In the winter of 1853, Finley began her literary career by writing a newspaper story and a little book published by the Baptist Board of Publication. Many of her early works were short stories contributed to the children's sections of Sunday-school papers. Originally written anonymously, the stories’ success led her publishers to ask her to include her name. At the time her family objected to her the publishing under her own name, so she chose "Martha Farquharson" as her pen name. 

Between 1856 and 1870, she wrote more than twenty Sunday school books and several series of juveniles, one series containing twelve books. These were followed by Casella (Philadelphia, 1869), Peddler of LaGrave, Old Fashioned Boy (Philadelphia, 1871), and Our Fred (New York City, 1874). It is through her "Elsie" and "Mildred" series that she became popular as a writer for the young. Finley did not write exclusively for the young. She wrote three novels, Wanted—A Pedigree (Philadelphia, 1879), Signing the Contract (New York, 1879), and Thorn in the Nest (New York. 1886).

Personal life
Finley resided in Elkton, Cecil County, Maryland, in a cottage which she built.   On March 3, 1892, she became a member of the Singerly Fire Company, the town's fire department, when she was issued stock certificate 33, which granted her full privileges of membership.  

There is no evidence to indicate other types of participation in the organization, as most likely Singerly generously benefited from financial contributions from the civic-minded, progressive writer.  But she was the only women listed on the rolls of the Elkton fire department until the mid-1970s

List of publications 
 Ella Clinton; or, By Their Fruits Ye Shall Know Them, Presbyterian Publications Board, 1856 – online at Project Gutenberg
 Aunt Ruth, Philadelphia, 1857
 Marion Harvie, Presbyterian Publications Board, 1857
 Annandale: A story of the times of the Covenanters, Presbyterian Publications Board, 1858
 Lame Letty, Philadelphia, 1859
 Try: Better Do It, Than Wish It Done, Presbyterian Publications Board, 1863
 Little Joe Carter, The Cripple, Presbyterian Publications Board, 1864
 Mysie's Work, Presbyterian Publications Board, 1864
 Willie Elton, The Little Boy Who Loved Jesus, Philadelphia, 1864
 Black Steve; or The Strange Warning, Presbyterian Publications Board, 1865
 Brookside Farm-House, Presbyterian Publications Board, 1865
 Hugo and Franz, Philadelphia, 1865
 Robert and Daisy, Philadelphia, 1865
 Allan's Fault, Presbyterian Publications Board, 1866
 Anna Hand, the Meddlesome Girl, Philadelphia, 1868
 Casella, Dodd, 1868
 Grandma Foster's Sunbeam, Philadelphia, 1868
 Little Dick Positive, Philadelphia, 1868
 The Little Helper, 1868
 Little Patience, Philadelphia, 1868
 Loitering Linus, Philadelphia, 1868
 Maude's Two Homes, Philadelphia, 1868
 Millie, or The Little Girl Who Tried To Help Others and Do Them Good, Philadelphia, 1868
 Stupid Sally, the Poor-House Girl, Philadelphia, 1868
 Amy and Her Kitten, Philadelphia, 1870
 Betty Page, Philadelphia, 1870
 The Broken Basket, Philadelphia, 1870
 Jamie by the Lake, Philadelphia, 1870
 Rufus the Unready, Philadelphia, 1870
 The White Dress, Philadelphia, 1870
 An Old-Fashioned Boy, Evans, 1871
 Lilian; or, Did She Do It Right?, Evans, 1871
 Wanted—A Pedigree, Dodd, 1871
 Contented Jim, Philadelphia, 1872
 Honest Jim, Presbyterian Publications Board, 1872
 How He Did It, Presbyterian Publications Board, 1872
 Noll in the Country, Presbyterian Publications Board, 1872
 The Twin Babies, Presbyterian Publications Board, 1872
 Our Fred, Donohue, 1874
 The Peddler of La Grave, Presbyterian Publications Board, 1875
 Aunt Hetty's Fowls, Presbyterian Publications Board, 1876
 Harry and His Chickens, Presbyterian Publications Board, 1876
 Harry and His Cousins, Presbyterian Publications Board, 1876
 Harry At Aunt Jane's, Presbyterian Publications Board, 1876
 Harry's Christmas in the City, Presbyterian Publications Board, 1876
 Harry's Fourth of July, Presbyterian Publications Board, 1876
 Harry's Grandma, Presbyterian Publications Board, 1876
 Harry's Little Sister, Presbyterian Publications Board, 1876
 Harry's Ride With Papa, Presbyterian Publications Board, 1876
 Harry's Walk With Grandma, Presbyterian Publications Board, 1876
 The Pewit's Nest, Presbyterian Publications Board, 1876
 Rosa and Robbie, Presbyterian Publications Board, 1876
 Signing the Contract, Dodd, 1879 – online at Project Gutenberg
 The Thorn in the Nest, Dodd, 1886 – online at Project Gutenberg
 The Tragedy of Wild River Valley, Dodd, 1893  – online at Project Gutenberg
 Twiddledetwit, A Fairytale, Dodd, 1898

 Elsie Dinsmore seriesElsie Dinsmore (1867) – online at Project GutenbergElsie's Holidays at Roselands (1868) – online at Project GutenbergElsie's Girlhood (1872) – online at Project GutenbergElsie's Womanhood (1875) – online at Project GutenbergElsie's Motherhood (1876) – online at Project GutenbergElsie's Children (1877) – online at Project GutenbergElsie's Widowhood (1880)Grandmother Elsie (1882) – online at Project GutenbergElsie's New Relations (1883) – online at Project GutenbergElsie at Nantucket (1884) – online at Project GutenbergThe Two Elsies (1885) – online at Project GutenbergElsie's Kith and Kin (1886) – online at Project GutenbergElsie's Friends at Woodburn (1887)Christmas with Grandma Elsie (1888) – online at Project GutenbergElsie and the Raymonds (1889)Elsie Yachting with the Raymonds (1890)Elsie's Vacation (1891) – online at Project GutenbergElsie at Viamede (1892)Elsie at Ion (1893)Elsie at the World's Fair (1894) – online at Project GutenbergElsie's Journey on Inland Waters (1895)Elsie at Home (1897) – online at Project GutenbergElsie on the Hudson (1898)Elsie in the South (1899)Elsie's Young Folks in Peace and War (1900)Elsie's Winter Trip (1902)Elsie and Her Loved Ones (1903)Elsie and Her Namesakes (1905)

 Mildred Keith series Mildred Keith (1876) – online at Project GutenbergMildred at Roselands (1880) – online at Project GutenbergMildred and Elsie (1881)Mildred's Married Life, and a Winter with Elsie Dinsmore (1882)Mildred at Home: With Something about her Relatives and Friends (1884)Mildred's Boys and Girls (1886)Mildred's New Daughter'' (1894)

References

Attribution

External links

 
 
 
 
 19th Century Girls' Series
  The Literature Network biography of Martha Finley
 

1828 births
1909 deaths
American children's writers
19th-century American novelists
20th-century American novelists
20th-century American women writers
19th-century American women writers
19th-century pseudonymous writers
20th-century pseudonymous writers
American women novelists
Novelists from Maryland
Novelists from Ohio
American women children's writers
People from Elkton, Maryland
Pseudonymous women writers
Wikipedia articles incorporating text from A Woman of the Century